The CONCACAF Gold Cup is North America's major tournament in senior men's football and determines the continental champion. Until 1989, the tournament was known as CONCACAF Championship. It is currently held every two years. From 1996 to 2005, nations from other confederations have regularly joined the tournament as invitees. In earlier editions, the continental championship was held in different countries, but since the inception of the Gold Cup in 1991, the United States are constant hosts or co-hosts.

From 1973 to 1989, the tournament doubled as the confederation's World Cup qualification. CONCACAF's representative team at the FIFA Confederations Cup was decided by a play-off between the winners of the last two tournament editions in 2015 via the CONCACAF Cup, but was then discontinued along with the Confederations Cup.

Since the inaugural tournament in 1963, the Gold Cup was held 26 times and has been won by seven different nations, most often by Mexico (11 titles).

It took Belize fourteen years from their independence in 1981 to their debut in international football in 1995. Since then, they have entered the tournament continuously, but only qualified once in 2003. Losing all three matches, they placed last in the tournament and are ranked 26th out of 27 nations in the all-time table.

Record at the CONCACAF Championship & Gold Cup

2013 CONCACAF Gold Cup

Group stage

Record Players

Nine players have been fielded in all three matches at Belize's only Gold Cup appearance.

Top Goalscorers
During their 1–6 defeat against the United States, Ian Gaynair scored the only Belizean goal in Gold Cup history.

References

Countries at the CONCACAF Gold Cup
Belize national football team